Walter Anderson may refer to:

Academics
Walter Anderson (historian) (1723–1800), British historian
Walter Anderson (folklorist) (1885–1962), German ethnologist (folklorist)
Walter Truett Anderson (born 1933), American political scientist, futurist, and author
Walter K. Andersen, American political scientist

Artists
Walter Anderson (English artist) (1822–1903), English painter, lithographer, and engraver
Walter Inglis Anderson (1903–1965), American painter

Military
Walter Stratton Anderson (1881–1981), Director of the United States Office of Naval Intelligence
Walter Anderson (RAF officer, died 1936) (1890–1936), RAF officer who died while flying for British Airlines
Walter Anderson (RAF officer, died 1959) (1890–1959), RAF officer and George Cross holder

Sports
Walter Anderson (footballer) (1879–1904), English footballer
Walter Anderson (baseball) (1897–1990), American baseball player
Walt Anderson (American football) (born c. 1952), American football referee

Other people
Walter Anderson (Australian politician) (1865–1939), New South Wales politician
Walter Anderson (trade unionist) (1910–1995), British trade union leader
Walter Anderson (editor) (born 1944), American CEO of PARADE Magazine
Walter Anderson (entrepreneur) (born 1953), American telephone entrepreneur and convicted tax evader